Egmont Village is a settlement in Taranaki, New Zealand. State Highway 3 runs through it. New Plymouth is 12 km to the north-west, and Inglewood is 6 km to the south-east. Waiwhakaiho River and Mangaoraka Stream flow past to the west and east, respectively.

Demographics
It is part of the larger Mangaoraka statistical area.

Egmont Village had a population of 327 at the 2018 New Zealand census, an increase of 48 people (17.2%) since the 2013 census, and an increase of 54 people (19.8%) since the 2006 census. There were 114 households, comprising 168 males and 165 females, giving a sex ratio of 1.02 males per female, with 72 people (22.0%) aged under 15 years, 51 (15.6%) aged 15 to 29, 168 (51.4%) aged 30 to 64, and 33 (10.1%) aged 65 or older.

Ethnicities were 94.5% European/Pākehā, 7.3% Māori, 1.8% Pacific peoples, 1.8% Asian, and 0.9% other ethnicities. People may identify with more than one ethnicity.

Although some people chose not to answer the census's question about religious affiliation, 60.6% had no religion, 29.4% were Christian, 0.9% were Buddhist and 2.8% had other religions.

Of those at least 15 years old, 45 (17.6%) people had a bachelor's or higher degree, and 48 (18.8%) people had no formal qualifications. 48 people (18.8%) earned over $70,000 compared to 17.2% nationally. The employment status of those at least 15 was that 147 (57.6%) people were employed full-time, 42 (16.5%) were part-time, and 9 (3.5%) were unemployed.

Mangaoraka statistical area

Mangaoraka had a population of 1,818 at the 2018 New Zealand census, an increase of 270 people (17.4%) since the 2013 census, and an increase of 567 people (45.3%) since the 2006 census. There were 624 households, comprising 933 males and 888 females, giving a sex ratio of 1.05 males per female. The median age was 39.8 years (compared with 37.4 years nationally), with 432 people (23.8%) aged under 15 years, 267 (14.7%) aged 15 to 29, 915 (50.3%) aged 30 to 64, and 207 (11.4%) aged 65 or older.

Ethnicities were 94.6% European/Pākehā, 10.1% Māori, 1.3% Pacific peoples, 1.0% Asian, and 2.3% other ethnicities. People may identify with more than one ethnicity.

The percentage of people born overseas was 10.9, compared with 27.1% nationally.

Although some people chose not to answer the census's question about religious affiliation, 57.1% had no religion, 32.0% were Christian, 0.3% had Māori religious beliefs, 0.2% were Buddhist and 1.5% had other religions.

Of those at least 15 years old, 222 (16.0%) people had a bachelor's or higher degree, and 264 (19.0%) people had no formal qualifications. The median income was $37,000, compared with $31,800 nationally. 303 people (21.9%) earned over $70,000 compared to 17.2% nationally. The employment status of those at least 15 was that 798 (57.6%) people were employed full-time, 246 (17.7%) were part-time, and 27 (1.9%) were unemployed.

Education
Egmont Village School is a coeducational full primary (years 1-8) school with a roll of  students as of  The school was founded in 1877. The school is the location of the Egmont Village Blockhouse, a defensive building set up in 1868, due to settlers' fears during Tītokowaru's War.

Further reading

General historical works

School

References

Populated places in Taranaki
New Plymouth District